Provincial council elections were held in Sri Lanka on 20 September 2014 to elect 34 members to one of the nine provincial councils in the country. 0.9 million Sri Lankans were eligible to vote in the election. Elections to the remaining eight provincial councils were not due as they had their last election in 2012, 2013 or 2014 (Mar).

The United People's Freedom Alliance's domination of Sri Lankan elections continued as expected. It retained control of Uva Provincial Council. However, the UPFA recorded a loss of votes in the province, after Presidential Election 2015 number of UPFA councillors crossed over to UNP to back Harin Fernando which enabled him to secure the position of Chief Minister and toppling the UPFA rule in Uva Province. After the 2015 General election Harin Fernando resigned from the Chief Minister position to take duties as a cabinet minister, Chamara Sampath Dassanayake was appointed. In September 2015, the council was turned into a unity government with United National Party MP Upali Samaraweera was given a minister position and rest of the 3 ministers were appointed from Sri Lanka Freedom Party.

Results

The UPFA won the control of the Uva provincial council.

References and footnotes

2014 elections in Asia
Provincial council elections
2014
September 2014 events in Asia